A Vida da Gente (English: The Life We Lead) is a Brazilian telenovela that was broadcast by TV Globo in 2011 and 2012.

The Life We Lead tells the touching story of two sisters, Ana and Manuela. The telenovela is about the love triangle between Ana, Manuela and Rodrigo, and family dramas lived by them after a tragic accident.

Starring Fernanda Vasconcellos, Marjorie Estiano, Rafael Cardoso, and Thiago Lacerda.

Plot
Drama, emotion, and love permeate the unconventional family ties in The Life We Lead. This brightly intensive telenovela reveals that love is the only thing that can sustain and nurture when life doesn't go according to plan.

Ana is a promising tennis player with a collection of titles and trophies to flaunt. She finds out she is pregnant by her loving boyfriend Rodrigo. Her controlling mother, Eva, forces her to break up with Rodrigo and compels her to stay out of town until the baby is born. Eva's biggest concern is that she doesn't lose any of her sponsorship deals. Later, Ana returns home and is eager to resume her athletic career, raise her baby Julia, and tell Rodrigo the truth. As always, she counts on her best friend and sister, Manuela, to give her support. But Eva lies to everyone, including Rodrigo, and says that Julia is the girls' sister, a result from a fling she had in the past. Throughout their lives, Eva had always been extremely overprotective and loving towards Ana but she never had a warm relationship with Manuela. On the contrary, Eva always went out of her way to put Manuela down. Ana and Manuela no longer wish to live side by side with their oppressive mother and deal with her unstable temperament. They decide to drive to their grandmother’s home, so they take off in the middle of the night with baby Julia. But they get into a horrible car accident on the way and Ana is left in a deep coma.

As time passes and there seems to be no progress in Ana's condition, Manuela takes over the role of Julia's mother. Devastated and feeling guilty, Manuela tells Rodrigo that Julia is really his daughter. Together, they go through all the difficulties and delights of raising a child and begin to feel a deep connection and love for each other. Five years later, Julia is a confident and happy child who turned to Manuela in her mother's absence although it was always made clear to her that she was really Ana's daughter.

But suddenly, Ana awakens from the coma to face a very different reality than what she remembers. Now she must deal with the mixed feelings provided by the life that she missed. She is happy to see a healthy, grown Julia and thankful to Manuela for looking after her daughter as if she was her own. But she is frustrated for not being able to express the choked up feelings she still has for Rodrigo and also envies Manuela for leading the life that belonged to her. Ana can still count on her loving sister to give her support in adapting to her new life until Eva finally succeeds in setting the girls against each other. She reassures Manuela that her feelings for Rodrigo remain in the past and even reveals that she has a crush on her doctor, Lucio. But deep down she strives to repress the love she still feels for Rodrigo.

Ana's great struggle to recover the life that went on without her is only surpassed because of positive attitude, persistence, and especially love. Her relationship with Manuela and the dedication of those who come to know her, reveal that unconditional love is the only thing that can overcome life's unexpected turnarounds. With radiant, colorful photography and breathtaking locations, The Life We lead is a moving telenovela that reveals how love can reunite families and even conquer the greatest hardships.

Cast 
 Fernanda Vasconcellos as Ana Fonseca, a promising tennis player who falls into a coma after a tragic accident
 Marjorie Estiano as Manuela Fonseca, Ana's older sister and best friend, who later becomes a buffet owner
 Rafael Cardoso as Rodrigo Macedo, Ana and Manuela's stepbrother, and Ana's childhood love. After the accident, he becomes Manuela's husband
 Thiago Lacerda as Dr. João Lúcio Pereira Pires, a widowed neurosurgeon who took care of Ana during the coma
 Ana Beatriz Nogueira as Eva Ribeiro Fonseca, Ana and Manuela's mother, who is overprotective towards Ana and indifferent towards Manuela
 Nicette Bruno as Iná Ribeiro, Ana and Manuela's grandmother
 Stênio Garcia as Laudelino, Iná's boyfriend
 Gisele Fróes as Vitória Azevedo Prates, Ana's tennis trainer, and Alice's birth mother
 Sthefany Brito as Alice Ybarra Morais, a friend of Ana and Manuela, who is searching for her birth mother
 Eriberto Leão as Gabriel, Manuela's boyfriend after she broke up with Rodrigo 
 Jesuela Moro as Júlia Fonseca, Ana and Rodrigo's daughter, raised by him with Manuela
 Paulo Betti as Jonas Macedo, Rodrigo's father, and Eva's ex-husband
 Regiane Alves as Cristiane "Cris" Oliveira Macedo, Jonas's personal trainer at the beginning, later becomes his wife
 Maria Eduarda de Carvalho as Fernanda "Nanda" Macedo, Rodrigo's older sister
 Leonardo Medeiros as Lourenço Luiz Macedo, Rodrigo's uncle, a literature teacher
 Leona Cavalli as Dr. Celina Gusmão Macedo, Lourenço's wife and Lúcio's co-worker at the hospital, a pediatrician 
 Kaic Crescente as Tiago Oliveira Macedo, Jonas and Cris's son
 Júlia Almeida as Lorena, Laudelino's granddaughter and Tiago's nanny
 Ângelo Antônio as Marcos Prates, Vitória's husband
 Malu Galli as Dora, Marcos's love interest
 Daniela Escobar as Suzana Ybarra Morais, Alice's adoptive mother
 Marcello Airoldi as Cícero Morais, Alice's adoptive father
 Alice Wegmann as Sofia Azevedo Prates, Vitória and Marcos's oldest daughter, a tennis player
 Júlia Gomes as young Sofia, at the beginning
 Marat Descartes as Lui, Nanda's love interest
 Tadeu di Pietro as Cléber, Jonas's lawyer
 Neusa Borges as Maria, Jonas's housekeeper at the beginning, later becomes co-owner of the Manuela's buffet
 Marcello Melo Jr. as Matias, Maria's son and Lorena's boyfriend, a gardener at Jonas's house
 Klebber Toledo as João, Alice's boyfriend
 Malu Valle as Vivian "Vivi" Mourão, Cris's best friend, a member of the high society of Rio Grande do Sul
 Luiz Carlos Vasconcelos as Renato Nogueira Martins, Alice's birth father
 Luiz Serra as Wilson, Laudelino's best friend and Moema's love interest, who suffers from obsessive–compulsive disorder
 Cláudia Mello as Moema, Iná's hypochondriac friend
 Duda Mamberti as Josias, Iná's employee at her dance house
 Rita Clemente as Aurélia, Iná's neighbour
 Sylvia Massari as Ângela, executive secretary in Jonas's office
 Pietra Pan as Bárbara Azevedo Prates, Vitória and Marcos's youngest daughter
 Nathália Costa as young Bárbara, at the beginning
 Rafael Almeida as Miguel, Sofia's love interest
 Anna Rita Cerqueira as Olívia, Dora's daughter
 Bia Petrenchunk as young Olívia, at the beginning
 Victor Navega Motta as Francisco, Lui's son
 Francisco Cuoco as Mariano Villaça, a businessman who sponsors athletes, later Vitória's love interest
 Polliana Aleixo as Cecília Villaça, Mariano's granddaughter, a tennis player

Awards and nominations

Recognitions 
Minha Novela (2011), Critic's Choice:
 Best Actress, (Marjorie Estiano).
 Best Child Actress (Jesuela Moro).
 Best Child Actor (Kaic Crescente).
 Best Telenovela.

Reception
‘The Life We Lead‘ won over audiences in Brazil and abroad. Licensed for 139 countries, the telenovela is the second largest sales success of TV Globo. In Uruguay (Teledoce), Costa Rica (Teletica) and Ecuador (Ecuavisa) the telenovela was leader in its timeslot. In Portugal, on the Basic Globo channel, the show was one of the most-watched programs on cable TV in the country. ‘The Life We Lead‘ also had its rights acquired by the channels Fox (the Netherlands), MundoFox (Hispanic United States), TDM (Macau), VIVA Plus (Israel), Abu Dhabi TV, and ABS-CBN (the Philippines), among others.

References

External links 
  
 https://web.archive.org/web/20111006140212/http://especial.segundachance.redeglobo.globo.com/
 

2011 Brazilian television series debuts
2012 Brazilian television series endings
2011 telenovelas
Brazilian telenovelas
TV Globo telenovelas
Portuguese-language telenovelas